LMS Ivatt Class 2 2-6-2T No. 41312 is an LMS Ivatt Class 2 2-6-2T that was built at Crewe Works in May 1952. It is one of four members of the class left in preservation but one of two that are located on the mainland (the second engine being 41241). The other two are located on the Isle of Wight.

Working life 
41312 was built by British Railways at Crewe Works in May 1952. From new until withdrawal it was allocated to the Southern Region of BR with its first shed allocation being at Faversham (73E) from May 1952. It was later allocated to: Ashford, Barnstaple Junction, Brighton and Bournemouth. In the last few months of steam operations on the Southern Region it was allocated to Nine Elms (70A) from 17 April 1967 and it was to remain there for the remainder of its working career.

It was withdrawn from service by BR when steam operations ended on the Southern Region of British Railways in July 1967. Following withdrawal it was sold to Woodham Brothers and taken to Barry Scrapyard.

Preservation

Mainline certification 
In the late 1990s, it was overhauled for use on the national network. For this it was given the TOPS number (British Rail Class 98) 98212. At the time the Mid Hants Railway were running their own charter train company known as "Daylight Railtours" and it was decided for it to be certified for mainline use to work a couple of smaller trains around the south of England. Due to its limited water capacity of 1,350 gallons, it was not able to stray too far from its home at the Mid Hants and it was not able to work the normal 10-to-11 coach trains that Daylight Railtours usually ran. It returned to service in 2016 after being overhauled, but has not been certified for mainline use.

References

External links 
 41312 Passing through Virginia Water

Preserved London, Midland and Scottish Railway steam locomotives
Locomotives saved from Woodham Brothers scrapyard